

Warburto is a locality in South Australia located on the west coast of Yorke Peninsula, consisting of the rural areas south of the town of Wallaroo around the headland of Warburto Point.

Description
Warburto is located within the federal division of Grey, the state electoral district of Narungga and the local government area of the Copper Coast Council. The boundaries of the gazetted locality were created in January 1999. As of 2014, land use within the locality consisted of agriculture being the major use, followed by conservation including the Bird Islands Conservation Park. In August 2014, sections were severed and added to the localities of Cross Roads, North Moonta and Paramatta to "better align postal delivery and to reflect historical associations". There was once a Warburto railway station on the former Wallaroo railway line.

References

Towns in South Australia
Spencer Gulf
Yorke Peninsula